HMS Penn was a P-class destroyer built for the Royal Navy during the Second World War.

Description
The P-class destroyers were repeats of the preceding O class, except that they were armed with 4-inch (102 mm) anti-aircraft guns. They were powered by two Parsons geared steam turbines, each driving one propeller shaft, using steam provided by two Admiralty three-drum boilers. The ships' complement was 176 officers and men.

Penn was armed with four QF 4-inch Mark V guns in single mounts, two pairs [superfiring] fore and aft. Her light anti-aircraft suite was composed of one quadruple mount for 2-pounder "pom-pom" guns and four single Oerlikon 20 mm cannon. The ship was fitted with two above-water quadruple mount for  torpedoes. The ship was fitted with four depth charge throwers and two racks for 70 depth charges.

Construction and career
Penn was ordered under the Wartime Emergency Programme and was laid down at the Newcastle-on-Tyne yard of Vickers Armstrong on 26 December 1939. Penn was launched on 12 February 1941. She was commissioned into the fleet on 10 February 1942. In that year she was adopted by the borough of Camberwell in London as part of Warship Week.

Penn was involved in Operation Pedestal, a convoy to bring much needed reinforcements to Malta. Captained by Acting Commander James Hamilton Swain, during the course of this operation, Penn helped bring the damaged  with her vital supplies of fuel into Grand Harbour, Valletta. Commander Swain was mentioned in dispatches and was also awarded the Distinguished Service Order (DSO) for the part he played in Operation Pedestal.

On 16/17 October 1943 Penn with the destroyer  sank the German submarine chaser  at Kalymnos. On 7 November 1943 Penn with sister ship  sank the German submarine trap GA45 off Amorgos, Greece.

On 15 June 1945, Penn with the destroyer , sank a Japanese landing craft off the Northwest coast of Sumatra.

In November 1945 Penn was in the East Indies, being used as an Air Target Ship. In February 1947 she was still part of the British Pacific Fleet and was attached to the 4th Submarine Flotilla. At the end of the year she returned to the UK and reduced to reserve at Harwich.

In April 1949 she was used for ship target trials and damage control trials. She was sold for scrap on 30 October 1950 and broken up at Troon.

Notes

References

External links
 

 

O and P-class destroyers
Ships built on the River Tyne
1941 ships
World War II destroyers of the United Kingdom
Cold War destroyers of the United Kingdom